Oud Beersel is a Belgian lambic brewery. It is a member of HORAL, whose main event is Toer De Geuze every two years.

History

Oud Beersel is an artisanal lambic brewery, based in Beersel and founded in 1882 by Henri Vandervelden. His son Louis, and then his grandson Henri, subsequently took over. In 1991, it was taken over by Henri's nephew Danny Draps. In 2002, the brewing activities were stopped, due to financial problems.

In 2005, driven by an interest in reviving the artisanal Oud Beersel kriek and geuze, two young men, Gert Christiaens and Roland De Bus, restarted the brewery. In order to finance the relaunch, the brewery is selling two beers called Bersalis Tripel and Bersalis Kadet, which are not lambic-based beers and are actually made by another brewery (the Huyghe Brewery in Melle). Bersalis is the old middle age name of the town of Beersel. Roland left the brewery after a few years.

In January 2022 the old pub of the brewery called "Het Bierhuis" was reopened after substantial renovation and restoration.

Beers
 Bersalis or Bersalis Tripel (9.5% ABV) gold yellow coloured (made at Huyghe Brewery in Melle)
 Bersalis Kadet (4.5%)
 Old Geuze (6.0%)
 Old Kriek (6.0%)
 Framboise (5.0%)
 lambic (around 5%, 1,2 or 3 year aged in wooden barrels, sold in 3,1 liters bag-in-box)

Liqueur
 Oud Kriekske (19%, ingredients: Old Kriek 'Oud Beersel', sour cherries, alcohol, sugar) - out of production

External links 
 

Belgian brands
Breweries of Flanders
Companies based in Flemish Brabant